Dr. Imre Vejkey (born 15 January 1964) is a Hungarian lawyer and politician, member of the National Assembly (MP) from Fidesz–KDNP Tolna County Regional List then the alliance's national list since 2010. He served as one of the recorders of the parliament for a short time between 17 June and 19 September 2013.

Vejkey was a member of the Constitutional Preparatory Ad Hoc Committee from 2010 to 2011, Committee on Foreign Affairs from 2010 to 2014, Committee on European Affairs from 2010 to 2013, Committee on Constitutional Affairs, Justice and Home Affairs from 2013 to 2014. He is a member of the Legislative Committee since 2014. He served as Chairman of the Immunity Committee from 2014 to 2017. Following the death of György Rubovszky, he was appointed Chairman of the Committee on Legal Affairs in September 2017.

References

1964 births
Living people
Eötvös Loránd University alumni
Hungarian jurists
Christian Democratic People's Party (Hungary) politicians
Members of the National Assembly of Hungary (2010–2014)
Members of the National Assembly of Hungary (2014–2018)
Members of the National Assembly of Hungary (2018–2022)
Members of the National Assembly of Hungary (2022–2026)
Politicians from Budapest